Arthur Cohen,  (18 November 1830 – 3 November 1914) was an English barrister and Liberal Party politician.

Biography 
He was born in Wyndham Place, Bryanston Square, London, the youngest son of Benjamin Cohen (1789–1867), a prosperous bill broker. His grandfather, Levy Barent Cohen (1740–1808), had moved from Holland. His mother, Justina (1800–1873), was the sister of Sir Moses Montefiore.

After three years' study at the gymnasium in Frankfurt-on-the-Main, he entered as a student at University College London. He proceeded to Cambridge University at a time when it was almost impossible for a Jew to gain admission into the colleges. In 1849, he was received into Magdalene College, Cambridge to read Mathematics. In 1853 he was president of the Cambridge Union Society. At Cambridge Cohen had a successful career, coming out fifth wrangler in the Mathematical tripos. As a Jew he could not take his degree until after the passing of the Cambridge Reform Act of 1856, which abolished the obligatory Christian oath which had preceded graduation. In 1858 Cohen became the first professing Jew to graduate at Cambridge, taking his MA in 1860.

Cohen then read law and was called to the bar in 1857. He established for himself a reputation in shipping and insurance cases. Among several important appointments was his selection to represent the interests of England in the famous arbitration case (Alabama Claims) connected with the CSS Alabama at Geneva in 1872.  He was for many years after 1876 standing counsel for his university. He often represented foreign governments in disputes before the English law courts, as, for example, the Japanese government in an important case against the Peninsular and Oriental Steam Navigation Company.

Cohen in 1874 unsuccessfully contested Lewes in the Liberal interest. In 1880, he was elected for the Southwark division, and shortly afterward in February 1881, was offered a judgeship, which he declined, Gladstone not wishing to trigger a risky by-election. The offer was never renewed, though later he became a judge of the Cinque Ports. In 1905, he was sworn of the Privy Council.

On his death, A. V. Dicey wrote that "The death of Arthur Cohen has robbed the Bar of one of its glories. He came as near as a man could to the ideal of an English lawyer. This assertion may no doubt appear to the ordinary public to savour of exaggeration. But it is in reality the simplest statement of an indubitable fact."

Cohen held various important positions in the London Jewish community. For many years he was president of the Board of Deputies, succeeding his uncle, Sir Moses Montefiore; but he resigned the position in 1894.  He was a vice-president of Jews' College, and for many years president of the borough Jewish schools.

In 1860, he married Emmeline, daughter of Henry Micholls. Their daughter Margaret married the educationalist Sir Theodore Morison.

Bibliography 

 Young Israel, ii., No. 13;
 People of the Period, 1897;
 Jewish Year Book, 1901–2.
 Dictionary of National Biography

External link

By Joseph Jacobs, Goodman Lipkind

References

External links 

Cohen's entry at Who's Who

1830 births
1914 deaths
English barristers
English Jews
Alumni of University College London
Alumni of Magdalene College, Cambridge
Liberal Party (UK) MPs for English constituencies
Presidents of the Cambridge Union
Politics of the London Borough of Southwark
UK MPs 1880–1885
UK MPs 1885–1886
UK MPs 1886–1892
Presidents of the Board of Deputies of British Jews
Jewish British politicians
Fellows of the British Academy
Members of the Privy Council of the United Kingdom
English people of Dutch-Jewish descent
Cohen family